Sunday at Six is a 1966 black-and-white psychological romance film by Romanian director Lucian Pintilie.

Cast 
 Irina Petrescu as Anca 
 Dan Nuțu as Radu 
 Constantin Cojocaru  
 Eugenia Bosânceanu as mother of Radu
 Eugenia Popovici as mother of Anca
 Graziela Albini as Maria
 Costel Constantinescu as worker Nea Manole
 Cătălina Pintilie	
 Marcel Gingulescu	
 Dorina Nila-Bentamar as a girl  
 Lidia Gabor
 Șerban Holban

References

External links
  
   Duminică la ora 6 (tiff.ro)

1966 films
Films directed by Lucian Pintilie
1960s Romanian-language films
1960s psychological films
Eastern Front of World War II films
Films set in 1940
Romanian black-and-white films
Romanian romance films
1966 war films
1966 directorial debut films